Tang Zhen (1630–1704), born Tang Dadao (唐大陶), courtesy name Zhuwan (铸万), was a Chinese philosopher and educator born in Dazhou during the late Ming and early Qing dynasties. His given name was Dahao, but later he changed his given name to Zhen and his courtesy name to Puyuan (圃園).

In 1657, he successfully achieved the rank of juren (举人) or quasi-master's degree provincial level. He then became the mayor of a town in Shanxi province. Later in life he became an author, philosophizing about politics and life.

References
Zhao, Zongzheng, "Tang Zhen". Encyclopedia of China (Philosophy Edition), 1st ed.

Philosophers from Sichuan
Qing dynasty philosophers
17th-century Chinese philosophers
1630 births
1704 deaths
Qing dynasty essayists
Writers from Dazhou
Politicians from Dazhou
Anti-monarchists
Qing dynasty politicians